Baluwatar (also Kathmandu Metropolitan City Ward 04) is a residential area of Kathmandu, the capital city of Nepal on the banks of Bagmati River. It is just 15 minutes away from what is known as the downtown of Kathmandu, New Road and Ason and shares borders with Lazimpat and Gairidhara.
Baluwatar hosts the Prime Minister of Nepal's official residence, government offices, Nepal Rastra Bank's headquarters, the Nepalese country headquarter of the International Organization for Migration the Russian Embassy and the office of Volunteer Service and Support Nepal (VSSN) are located here.

A Nepal Army's Para Special Forces Battalion (Bhairab Dal) and Air Wing, TU Teaching Hospital, Nepal Police Headquarters and the home of the former King Gyanendra and the current Presidential Palace are in the vicinity. There are some schools such as Meridian International School, Shiva Puri secondary school and many others. It is the most infrastructural developed city in Nepal due to place of  prime minister's residence.

In 2012, Occupy Baluwatar of the occupy movement was apeaceful protest movement calling on the Nepali state to better address the widespread problem of impunity and gender-based violence.

References

Populated places in Bagmati Province
Neighbourhoods in Kathmandu